Second Facet is a steep ice-free bluff standing just west of First Facet, the two features together forming the north wall of Debenham Glacier in Victoria Land. Charted and descriptively named by the British Antarctic Expedition under Scott, 1910–13.

Cliffs of Victoria Land
Scott Coast